Martinus Nijhoff (20 April 1894, in The Hague – 26 January 1953, in The Hague) was a Dutch poet and essayist. He studied literature in Amsterdam and law in Utrecht. His debut was made in 1916 with his volume De wandelaar ("The wanderer"). From that moment he gradually expanded his reputation by his unique style of poetry: not experimental, like Paul Van Ostaijen, yet distinguished by the clarity of his language combined  with mystical content. He was a literary craftsman who employed skilfully various verse forms from different literary epochs.

Some of his best-known works include Het Uur U ("H Hour", 1936) and the long poem  (1934). A number of individual sonnets also rose to fame, particularly De Moeder de Vrouw ("The Mother the Woman/Wife") commemorating the opening of a bridge over the river Waal near Zaltbommel. Joseph Brodsky considered the poem Awater one of the grandest poems of the 20th century. He was awarded Constantijn Huygens Prize posthumously in 1953.

See also

 Heer Halewijn
 Corpus Inscriptionum et Monumentorum Religionis Mithriacae

Notes

External links
 
  File Martinus Nijhoff in the Digital Library of Dutch Literature (DBNL)
  Biography Martinus Nijhoff (W.A. Ornée, 'Nijhoff, Martinus (1894–1953)', in Biografisch Woordenboek van Nederland [Biographical Dictionary of The Netherlands], 13-03-2008)

1894 births
1953 deaths
Dutch male poets
Writers from The Hague
Constantijn Huygens Prize winners
20th-century Dutch poets
20th-century Dutch male writers